The Smith–Jessup House is a historic house at 1038 W. North Bend Road in Springfield Township, Hamilton County, Ohio. Daniel Smith built the house circa 1825. Farmer David Jessup bought the house in the 1830s and lived there for much of the 19th century. The Federal Style house is an uncommon example of the style in unincorporated Springfield Township. The -story brick house features a three-bay front facade, a wooden frieze, and a gable roof.

The house was listed in the National Register on August 23, 1984.

Notes 

Houses on the National Register of Historic Places in Ohio
National Register of Historic Places in Cincinnati
Federal architecture in Ohio
Houses completed in 1825
Houses in Cincinnati
1825 establishments in Ohio